Jireel Lavia Pereira, born 29 March 2000 in Angola, is a Swedish rapper best known under his artist name Jireel. In 2017, he released his debut EP Jettad. In 2018, he released his debut studio album, 18, for which he won a Grammis award in the category "Hip Hop/Soul of the Year" in 2019. It was Jireel's second Grammis award, after receiving the award for "New Artist of the Year" in 2018. On 5 June 2020, Jireel released his second studio album, Sex känslor. It contains the previously released singles "För evigt" (featuring Estraden), "Gav allt" (with Victor Leksell and Reyn), "Relationer" and "Chérie". The album peaked at number five on the Swedish Albums Chart. Jireel went to Gubbängsskolan and performed there some years after he left it.

Discography

Albums

Extended plays

Singles

Featured singles

Other charted songs

Notes

References

External links
 Official Facebook

Living people
2000 births
Musicians from Stockholm
Singers from Stockholm
Swedish pop singers
Swedish songwriters
21st-century Swedish singers
Swedish hip hop musicians
Swedish-language singers
21st-century Swedish male singers
Swedish rappers

Swedish people of Angolan descent